José Guerrero is a Spanish former professional tennis player.

Guerrero featured in the main draw of the 1971 French Open, where he was beaten in the second round by sixth seed Stan Smith. He competed on the Grand Prix tennis circuit during the 1970s and took a set off the world's top ranked player Ilie Năstase in Madrid in 1973.

References

External links
 
 

Year of birth missing (living people)
Living people
Spanish male tennis players
Mediterranean Games medalists in tennis
Mediterranean Games silver medalists for Spain
Competitors at the 1971 Mediterranean Games